Doberes is a genus of butterflies in the family Hesperiidae.

Species
Recognised species in the genus Doberes include:
 Doberes anticus (Plötz, 1884)

References

Natural History Museum Lepidoptera genus database

Pyrginae
Hesperiidae genera
Taxa named by Frederick DuCane Godman
Taxa named by Osbert Salvin